A large and dynamic storm system bought widespread impacts across much of the United States at the end of February 2023. In the Western United States, heavy snow, hail, and gusty winds affected many areas. This led to the partial closure of several major highways, including I-205 in the Portland, Oregon metropolitan area, as well as numerous fatal accidents on other highways. Hundreds of flights were cancelled, thousands of people lost power, and multiple sporting events were postponed. In the Great Plains and Mississippi Valley, significant impacts from severe weather occurred. A severe squall line produced destructive straight-line winds in the St. Louis metropolitan area on February 23. The most impactful day in terms of severe weather was on February 26, when a powerful line of severe thunderstorms containing damaging straight-line winds and multiple embedded tornadoes impacted the Texas Panhandle, southern Kansas, and most of the state of Oklahoma. Dozens of instances of large hail, damaging wind gusts, and multiple tornadoes were confirmed with this event, including an EF2 tornado that killed a person in Cheyenne, Oklahoma. A  wind gust from straight-line winds was reported in Memphis, Texas, which was the highest wind gust since the August 2020 Midwest derecho. Five of these tornadoes formed in the Oklahoma City metro area, including a high-end EF2 tornado that caused severe damage in the southeastern part of the city of Norman. The event set the record for the most tornadoes ever recorded in Oklahoma in the month of February since modern records began in 1950. More tornadoes touched down in Illinois the next day, including some in the Chicago metropolitan area. In addition to the severe weather impacts, parts of the Midwestern United States also received periods of heavy snowfall and gusty winds along with ice, causing dozens of accidents, knocking out power, and canceling hundreds of flights. The Northeastern United States was also affected by heavy snowfall.

Meteorological synopsis

An upper-air disturbance, combined with high-altitude cold air and low pressure, dove southeast from British Columbia into the Western United States on February 21.

Impacts

Along the path of the winter storm, countless school districts across numerous states cancelled or delayed classes. Inclement weather forced the closure of many roadways. Weather watches and warnings were issued for snowfall, freezing rain, heavy rainfall, strong winds, and extreme cold.

Western United States
Winter storm watches were hoisted for mountainous regions of the California Bay Area, the first since 2011, while only the second ever blizzard warning was issued for Los Angeles County, and the first blizzard warning ever issued by the National Weather Service of San Diego. Evacuation warnings were issued for Ventura County due to anticipated flooding and debris flows. In Arizona, American Airlines issued travel waivers for Flagstaff Pulliam Airport in anticipation of strong winds. Farther north in Oregon, the Portland Timbers of Major League Soccer postponed their opening match of the 2023 season due to the storm; it had been scheduled to take place on February 25 but was moved to February 27.

Oregon

In Oregon, snow fell in Troutdale, Tigard, Stayton, Cathedral Park, Chapman Square, and Beaverton, in which the latter received  of snow. Portland recorded  of snow, their largest accumulation on record so late in the winter season and the second-largest calendar day observation in the city's history. For much of the Portland metro area, the heavy snow came as a surprise with some weather models having struggled to capture eventual location of the system. On US 26 near Portland, more than 70 cars were abandoned because of the difficult driving conditions. Snow and ice led to the closure of I-205 over the Glenn L. Jackson Memorial Bridge, as well as a 2-mile stretch due to stalled vehicles from high snow accumulations with several other highways closing in Oregon, including US 101 and OR 34, where downed trees blocked the routes. Around 400 flights were cancelled at Portland International Airport. Two deaths occurred in the city. Snow led to the suspension of Newport's seafood and wine festival. MAX Light Rail trains and TriMet buses were stalled, causing the delay of passengers arriving to their destinations. The inclement weather forced the closure of the City Hall in Lincoln City. At least 15,000 power outages occurred across the state. In neighborhing Washington, snow fell in the Cascade Range and the Northern Rockies. The heavy snows, combined with  wind gusts, hindered efforts to rescue four people from an earlier avalanche, with only one surviving.

California

In California, there were at least 172,000 power outages. Trees and power lines were knocked, down, including a tree which fell on several cars and an apartment building in Manhattan Beach. A tornado was also reported near Whittier on February 23. A 1-year-old was critically injured after a tree fell on top of them in Boulder Creek. For the first time in several years, hail fell on the Hollywood Sign. Cars were stranded on I-15 for several hours as snow, hail, and high winds impacted travel. There was a 20-car pileup on I-10 in Yucaipa, causing several injuries, while a 12-car pileup occurred on SR 189 near Crestline. An accident in Tujunga that left one person dead and two others injured may have been related to the storm; however, the exact cause of the accident is under investigation. Major League Soccer's 2023 season opener on February 25 at the Rose Bowl in Pasadena was rescheduled to July 4 due to the worsening weather. Snow fell at unusually low elevations across Greater Los Angeles, (including in the upper reaches of the Crescenta Valley), the High Desert, and in parts of Northern California such as Eureka, Crescent City, Ukiah, Lakeport, and Cloverdale. High seas led to the closure of the Redondo Beach pier. Snowy conditions in the Bay Area also led to road closures along SR 17, SR 29, and SR 128.

Arizona
In Arizona, 20,000 power outages were reported, with 9,000 in Coconino County and 5,000 in Maricopa County. Over  of I-40 closed, from the New Mexico state line until the junction with US 93. In Utah, at least 110-120 crashes were reported, including on I-15, and I-84. In neighboring Nevada, a Care Flight medical flight crashed shortly after takeoff near Stagecoach, killing all five occupants. An investigation by the National Transportation Safety Board is ongoing to determine the cause of the accident.

Elsewhere 
In Colorado, over 200 flights were cancelled at Denver International Airport. Crashes were reported on I-25 and I-70, causing road disruptions. On February 25, an avalanche near the Vallecito Reservoir in La Plata County killed two people while another killed one person in La Manga Pass. Northward in Wyoming, a large portion of I-80 was closed. Snow stranded drivers and caused difficult conditions for first responders, including a near-miss when a semi almost hit a Wyoming Department of Transportation trooper.

Midwestern United States
In South Dakota, health departments, including Sanford Health and Avera Health, announced closures in Sioux Falls. Governor Kristi Noem ordered state government executive branch offices closed in 36 counties. Parts of I-90 and I-29 closed. To the east, the National Weather Service forecast office in the Twin Cities warned of a "historic" winter storm. About 1,600 free parking lots were made available in Minneapolis because of the inclement hazardous weather. Numerous airlines, such as Delta, Southwest, United, and American airlines issued travel waivers in Minneapolis–Saint Paul International Airport. The Weather Prediction Center issued a rare extreme impact risk area. Minnesota Governor Tim Walz issued a peacetime emergency and ordered emergency executive orders to the National Guard, Minnesota State Patrol, and Minnesota Department of Transportation. Snow emergencies were issued in the cities of Brooklyn Park, Crystal, and New Hope. Numerous businesses and stores, including Lunds & Byerlys, were closed. A no travel advisory was issued for several counties, including Brown, Cottonwood, Jackson, Martin, and Watonwan counties. In Wisconsin, Green Bay–Austin Straubel International Airport cancelled all flights on February 22 and most flights on February 23.

Snow accumulated as high as  four miles north of Rochester, Minnesota. Hundreds of crashes were reported, including jackknifed semi-trucks. Wind gusts of over  impacted the Twin cities. There were at least 134 calls for service to the south in Iowa, including 48 crashes which resulted in 10 injuries. To the east in Wisconsin, I-94 was closed, as well as Green Bay regional airports. There were more than 10,000 power outages, with 9,200+ of those outages from Kenosha alone. Hundreds of flights were cancelled at Milwaukee Mitchell International Airport. Snow emergencies were declared in Green Bay, Menasha, and Kaukauna. A parking garage in Glendale partially collapsed, damaging two cars. To the east, there were at least 811,000 power outages across Michigan, with over 485,000 in the Detroit Metropolitan Area alone. There was extreme amount of damage to power infrastructure. One firefighter died when a power line fell on him in Paw Paw. To the south in Illinois, icy conditions caused downed trees and power lines, blocking roads. 89,000 customers were without power in the Chicago metropolitan area.

Severe weather impacted the middle Mississippi Valley on February 22, particularly in the eastern St. Louis metropolitan area, where multiple reports of wind damage came in mainly for tree and power line damage.

Elsewhere
Pittsburgh hit  for the third time in February 2023, the first time in history that Pittsburgh reached seventy degrees or higher in February three times.

Heavy snowfall fell in parts of the New York City metropolitan area between February 27 and 28. By the morning of February 28, New Canaan, Connecticut had received  of snow, while Port Jervis, New York and Bloomingdale, New Jersey had received  respectively. Despite the snow that fell, however, it wound up being one of the least snowy December-February periods across the region. The snow led to a 15-car pileup on the Massachusetts Turnpike.

Tornado outbreak

February 26

The threat for organized severe weather across Oklahoma and adjacent areas was first highlighted by the Storm Prediction Center (SPC) nearly a week before the event, on February 21 with a 15 percent risk area issued for the eastern Texas Panhandle, the western half of Oklahoma and much of Kansas. The next day, as computer models began to exhibit greater consistency from run to run, a portion of the risk area was upgraded to a 30 percent risk area, and subsequently to a level 3/Enhanced risk on the day 3 convective outlook. The day before the event, this Enhanced risk was expanded northeastward toward Missouri and a level 4/Moderate risk was introduced across western Oklahoma, where increasing confidence caused forecasters to advertise the potential for a widespread damaging wind event. On February 26, the greatest risk area was again extended across much of Oklahoma, and the SPC also messaged the potential for a few strong/EF2+ tornadoes across southwestern portions of the state. The 1630 UTC day 1 outlook noted that a powerful derecho with embedded swaths of  straight-line winds was likely, along with embedded tornadoes – including the risk for strong (EF2+) tornadoes – and isolated instances of very large hail.

On the morning of February 26, water vapor imagery depicted a well-defined and compact cold-core low progressing eastward across California and Nevada. A powerful shortwave trough accompanied this feature. Farther to the east, a warm front stretched from southern Louisiana across southern Texas, separating cooler and drier air to the north from a more unstable environment to the south. As low-level flow increased in advance of the cold-core low, southerly winds allowed that moist airmass to surge rapidly northward throughout the morning and afternoon hours. Much of the Texas and Oklahoma panhandles, as well as western Oklahoma, experienced a four to eight degree increase in dewpoints within just a three-hour period. The meteorologists at the SPC noticed this and issued a Tornado Watch for parts of Texas and Oklahoma. The Tornado Watch was later expanded into central, northern and southern Oklahoma. Also Prior to the development of thunderstorms, strong wind fields already existed across the region, with bulk wind shear topping  and forecast to increase further.

As the evening approached, supercells developed in the Texas Panhandle, further organizing as a cold front overtook the preexisting dryline and contributed to greater focus for convective activity. To the north, a complex line of storms developed near a  surface low in southwestern Kansas, where multiple tornadoes were reported. With time, the originally discrete storms from the Texas Panhandle became intertwined with a solidifying squall line pushing eastward into Oklahoma. These storms entered an environment of richer moisture, with dewpoints into the low 60s °F northward to near I-40, and modest instability on the order of 500-1,000 J/kg. Despite the presence of a capping inversion, strong forcing along the cold front was expected to erode inhibition, while low-level winds topping  worked to assist in broad swaths of damaging winds. Favorable wind shear profiles supported embedded mesovortices and QLCS tornadoes within the line as the storm complex continued east. Multiple tornadoes occurred in the Eastern Texas Panhandle and Western Oklahoma, including a high-end EF2 tornado that obliterated manufactured homes and killed one person at the western edge of Cheyenne. Several damaging QLCS tornadoes also ended up touching down throughout the Oklahoma City metropolitan area, including another high-end EF2 tornado that caused significant damage in southeastern Norman. As storms entered eastern Oklahoma, they encountered a less favorable environment and weakened considerably, reducing the threat for severe weather with eastward extent into the pre-dawn hours of February 27, although scattered wind and tornado reports continued all the way into Missouri. In all, 12 tornadoes touched down in Oklahoma; the day alone set the record for the most tornadoes ever recorded in Oklahoma during the month of February (the previous record was 6 in February of 1975 and 2009).

More than 76,000 people in Oklahoma lost power on the night of February 27, though it was restored for most by the following morning. Amtrak's northbound Heartland Flyer was severely delayed due to debris on the tracks caused by the EF2 Norman tornado.

February 27
More severe weather was forecast for February 27, although the threat area was initially poorly forecast. A 15 percent risk area was initially outlined for eastern Kentucky and eastern Tennessee on February 24. The outlined area was given a slight risk the next day, thought weather data models began to show that ingredients for severe weather were shifting farther north towards the Ohio Valley region. The slight risk was then shifted northwestward twice the subsequent day at both day 2 outlook times. By the time the day 1 outlook was issued, the slight risk covered much of the Ohio Valley. While only moderate instability was in place, very strong wind shear and a discrete convective mode close to the surface low brought the possibility of both damaging winds and a few tornadoes in this area, with a 5% tornado risk area in place for much of Ohio, and a 2% tornado risk present farther west across Indiana and Illinois. Later that day, multiple supercell thunderstorms developed in Illinois before they tracked eastward. Two EF0 tornadoes caused minimal damage in the Chicago suburbs of Plainfield and Naperville. Farther east in Indiana, a high-end EF1 tornado damaged the roof of a warehouse, snapped trees, and damaged or destroyed barns and outbuildings near McCordsville. In Ohio, another high-end EF1 tornado caused considerable damage to homes, trees, and outbuildings in and around Jacksonburg. An EF0 tornado overturned mobile homes and damaged abandoned farm structures at the Pickaway Correctional Institution near Orient. Several other weak tornadoes were also confirmed across all three states as well.

Confirmed tornadoes

February 26 event

February 27 event

See also

 List of United States tornadoes from January to March 2023
 List of North American tornadoes and tornado outbreaks
 Weather of 2023

Notes

References 

2023 meteorology
F2 tornadoes
Tornadoes of 2023
2023 natural disasters in the United States
Tornadoes in Kansas
Tornadoes in Texas
Tornadoes in Oklahoma
Tornadoes in Missouri
Tornadoes in Illinois